Neurophyseta paroalis is a moth in the family Crambidae. It was described by Schaus in 1906. It is found in Brazil.

References

Moths described in 1906
Musotiminae